Gornozavodsk is a town and the administrative center of Gornozavodsky District in Perm Krai, Russia, located  northeast of Perm, the administrative center of the krai. Population:  It was previously known as Novopashiysky (until 1965).

History
Until the mid-1940s, there was a small railway station on the site of today's town, and the station buildings were closely adjoined by a forest. In 1947, construction of a cement plant began, the first phase of which has been in operation since 1955. As the plant developed, the settlement, which was called Novo-Pashisky, grew too. In 1950 it was given an urban-type settlement status.

On the 4th of November 1965 under the decree of the Presidium of the Supreme Soviet of RSFSR Novopashiskiy settlement had been transformed to a town of regional subordination and was renamed as Gornozavodsk. The same decree established the Gornozavodsky District with its centre in the town of Gornozavodsk.

Administrative and municipal status
Within the framework of administrative divisions, Gornozavodsk serves as the administrative center of Gornozavodsky District, to which it is directly subordinated. As a municipal division, the town of Gornozavodsk, together with two rural localities, is incorporated within Gornozavodsky Municipal District as Gornozavodskoye Urban Settlement.

References

Notes

Sources

External links
Official website of Gornozavodsk 
Gornozavodsk Business Directory jsprav.ru 

Cities and towns in Perm Krai
Populated places in Gornozavodsky District
Cities and towns built in the Soviet Union
Populated places established in 1947
1947 establishments in Russia